Interstate 15 (I-15) is a major Interstate Highway in the western United States, running through Southern California and the Intermountain West. I-15 begins near the Mexican border in San Diego County and stretches north to Alberta, Canada, passing through the states of California, Nevada, Arizona, Utah, Idaho, and Montana. The Interstate serves the cities of San Diego, San Bernardino, Las Vegas, St. George, Provo, Salt Lake City, Ogden, Pocatello, Idaho Falls, Butte, Helena, and Great Falls. It also passes close to the urban areas of Los Angeles, Orange, and Riverside counties, California. The stretches of I-15 in Idaho, Utah, and Arizona have been designated as the "Veterans Memorial Highway". The southern end is at a junction with I-8 and State Route 15 (SR 15) in San Diego, and the northern end is at a connection with Alberta Highway 4 at the Sweetgrass–Coutts Border Crossing.

I-15 was built to connect the Inland Empire with San Diego in California, facilitate tourism access to Las Vegas, provide access to the Arizona Strip, interconnect all of the metropolitan statistical areas in Utah except for Logan, and provide freeway bypasses for Pocatello, Idaho Falls, and Great Falls. Since its creation, I-15 has served as a long-haul route for North American commerce. It is now officially chartered for this purpose: from the junction of I-515 in Las Vegas to the Canadian border, I-15 forms part of the CANAMEX Corridor, a High Priority Corridor, as a result of the North American Free Trade Agreement. Since the construction of I-15, California, Idaho, Nevada, and Utah have consistently ranked in the fastest-growing areas of the United States. As a result, the route of I-15 has substantially increased in population and commuter traffic.

Route description

|-
|CA
|
|-
|NV
|
|-
|AZ
|
|-
|UT
|
|-
|ID
|
|-
|MT
|
|-
|Total
|
|}

This highway's southern terminus is in San Diego, California, at I-8, although via SR 15, a southern extension of the freeway, the route connects to I-5 just north of the Mexico–US border. The northern terminus is in Sweet Grass, Montana, at the Canada–US border, where it becomes Alberta Highway 4.

California

North of its junction with SR 91 in Corona, the route roughly follows the former routes of State Route 31. North of Devore, the highway follows the approximate alignment of historic US Route 66 along with US 91 and US 395. US 395 breaks away at Hesperia and the route continues on a direct path to Barstow  to the north. Meanwhile, the old alignments of US 91 and US 66 follow the Mojave River from Victorville to Barstow along the National Trails Highway. At that point, I-15 follows the old route of US 91 exclusively as US 66 turned east toward Needles. For many parts of the highway, high-voltage powerlines, such as Path 46 and Path 27, almost all originating from the Hoover Dam, follow the freeway. Many of these link distant power stations to the Los Angeles metropolitan area.

The southern starting point of I-15 was in 1957 planned to be in San Bernardino, at the interchange with the San Bernardino Freeway (then US 70/US 99, now I-10). This was logical as I-15 was following the old alignment of the historic Route 66 which passed through San Bernardino. The segment was completed accordingly.

In 1964, legislation was later passed to extend the Interstate to San Diego. Instead of extending the existing freeway from the I-10 interchange south, however, the California Department of Transportation drew a new segment in Devore that "branched" off of the original alignment and bypassed San Bernardino altogether. The segment that had been built from Devore to San Bernardino was retained as an Interstate, but was renumbered as I-215. Note that during the construction of I-15's present alignment, and for some time afterward, I-215 was numbered as I-15E, and its actual mileage would begin at I-10.

Nevada

I-15 begins in Primm and continues through Las Vegas along the Las Vegas Strip corridor. Then, the Interstate crosses the border with Arizona in Mesquite.

Arizona

The stretch is separated from the rest of the state and has one major exit, at Beaver Dam/Littlefield, Arizona. It includes a spectacular section where the road twists between the narrow walls of the Virgin River Gorge.

Utah

It is the main north–south connection for the state. The highway approximately follows the old alignment of US 91 from St. George to Brigham City. The highway passes through the fast-growing Utah's Dixie region in the southwestern part of the state, which includes St. George, Cedar City, and eventually most of the major cities and suburbs along the Wasatch Front, including Provo, Orem, Sandy, Salt Lake City, Layton, and Ogden. Near Cove Fort, I-70 begins its journey eastward across the country. Along nearly its entire length through the state, I-15 winds its way along the western edge of a nearly continuous range of mountains (the Wasatch Range in the northern half of the state). The only exceptions are north of Cove Fort and when it passes between Cedar City and St. George, known as the Black Ridge, a transition zone of drastic change in elevation and climate, an area where the eastern Great Basin, Colorado Plateau, and Mojave Desert converge.

Idaho

I-15 crosses the Utah state line in Oneida County. The highway runs through Pocatello, Blackfoot, and Idaho Falls, intersecting with I-86. The last county in Idaho that I-15 passes through is Clark County. Finally, the Interstate reaches the Montana state line at Monida Pass.

Montana

I-15 continues onward through  of Montana through the cities of Butte, Helena, and Great Falls, intersecting with I-90, I-115, and I-315. At Sweet Grass, I-15 terminates upon crossing the Canadian border into the province of Alberta; however, I-15 signage is present on Alberta Highway 4 southbound from Lethbridge to the Canadian border.

History
I-15 was constructed along the route of US 91. Once I-15 was relatively intact, US 91 was decommissioned, except for one part in Northern Utah / Southern Idaho where I-15 instead followed the route of former US 191.

I-15 originally had two suffixed routes. In California, I-15 had an eastern branch bypassing San Bernardino, which was designated I-15E. I-15E was renumbered and is now I-215. Present day routing of I-15 in California was originally given "I-15W" as its title while it was under construction (the original asphalt portions from Temescal Canyon to Ontario Avenue were dubbed I-15W on maps until 1974), but was never officially signed as such. In Idaho, I-15 had a western branch near Pocatello that connected I-15 and I-84 (then I-80N). This highway was designated I-15W. It is now the western I-86.

Growth along route
Since the construction of I-15, California, Nevada, and Utah have consistently ranked in the fastest-growing areas of the United States. As a result, the route of I-15 has substantially increased in population and commuter traffic has increased the traffic burden on the freeway. Current population estimates are that more than 75 percent of the population of Utah, 19 percent of the population of California, and more than 70 percent of the population of Nevada live in counties where I-15 is the primary Interstate Highway.

Similarly, in California, I-15 is seeing more commuter traffic due to the growth of the Mojave Desert communities of Hesperia, Victorville, and Barstow. In Utah, I-15 has been near-constantly upgraded in the Wasatch Front, and future plans released by the Utah Department of Transportation (UDOT) indicate that this will continue in the north and the far south of the state as well, due to the extremely rapid growth of Washington County and surrounding areas. In like manner, Las Vegas in Nevada has seen growth along I-15, and in all of the states that it currently serves, it has recently been or is currently in the process of being upgraded to increase capacity and efficiency. The portions in Arizona, Idaho and Montana have retained their rural, long-haul character. Although Arizona has also grown substantially since the construction of I-15, this highway serves only the isolated corner of northwestern Arizona.

Due to this rapid area growth, the I-15 corridor is the focus of several mass transit projects. The Las Vegas Monorail, FrontRunner commuter rail system, and TRAX light rail in Salt Lake City are mass transit lines loosely parallel to I-15 that are now in operation. Between Los Angeles and Las Vegas has long been proposed as a maglev train route; in 2004 the California–Nevada Interstate Maglev project held public meetings on the plan.

Future 
The segment signed as SR 15 from I-5 to I-8 in San Diego is planned to be redesignated as part of I-15 once this segment is completely upgraded to Interstate standards, namely where the freeway's interchange with SR 94 is concerned. The interchange currently has left-exits and blind merges, and is due to be updated with a long-awaited widening of both SR 15 and SR 94. At that time, SR 15 is planned be resigned as part of I-15. The remaining portion of SR 15 conforms with Interstate standards.

Junction list
California
 32nd Street and Norman Scott Road in Barrio Logan, San Diego (future interchange)
  on the Barrio Logan–Southcrest–Logan Heights, San Diego neighborhood line (future interchange)
  on the North Park–City Heights, San Diego neighborhood line (future interchange)
  on the Mission Valley East–Grantville, San Diego neighborhood line
  in Murrieta
  in Ontario
  near San Bernardino
  in Hesperia
  in Barstow
Nevada
  in Enterprise
  in Las Vegas. I-15/US 93 travels concurrently to northeast of North Las Vegas.
Arizona
 No major intersections
Utah
  south-southwest of Cove Fort
  north-northeast of Holden. The highways travel concurrently to Scipio.
  in Santaquin. The highways travel concurrently to Spanish Fork.
  in Provo
  in Lehi. The highways travel concurrently to Draper.
  in Murray
  in South Salt Lake. The highways travel concurrently to Salt Lake City.
  in Salt Lake City
  in North Salt Lake
  in North Salt Lake
  on the West Bountiful–Bountiful city line. The highways travel concurrently to Farmington.
  in Riverdale. The highways travel concurrently to Tremonton.
  on the Perry–Brigham City city line.
Idaho
  north-northwest of Virginia. The highways travel concurrently to Pocatello.
  northwest of McCammon. The highways travel concurrently to Pocatello.
  in Chubbuck
  southwest of Blackfoot
  in Blackfoot. The highways travel concurrently to Idaho Falls.
  in Idaho Falls. The highways travel concurrently through Idaho Falls.
Montana
  in Butte. The highways travel concurrently through Butte.
  in Butte
  in Helena. I-15/US 287 travels concurrently to northeast of Wolf Creek.
  in Great Falls. I-15/US 89 travels concurrently to northeast of Vaughn.
  in Shelby
  at the Sweetgrass-Coutts Border Crossing in the Canadian border east-northeast of Sweet Grass

Auxiliary routes
Inland Empire, California – I-215
Henderson, Nevada – I-515
Las Vegas, Nevada – I-215
Salt Lake City, Utah – I-215
Butte, Montana – I-115
Great Falls, Montana – I-315

See also

 State Route 15
 U.S. Route 66
 U.S. Route 91

References

External links

 
 https://web.archive.org/web/20030626140609/http://www.dot.ca.gov/dist11/facts/I-15managed.pdf
 2005 Rand McNally The Road Atlas 2005- newest feature- interstate mileage by state

 California
 California Highways: SR 15
 Cal-NExUS: Route 15 North
 Cal-NExUS: Route 15 South

 Arizona
 I-15 Completed December 14, 1973

 
15
U.S. Route 91